Narendranagar Legislative Assembly Constituency is one of the 70 assembly constituencies of Uttarakhand a northern state of India. Narendranagar is part of Garhwal Lok Sabha constituency.

Members of Legislative Assembly
 2007 - Om Gopal Rawat (UKD)
 2012 - Subodh Uniyal (INC)
 2017 - Subodh Uniyal (BJP)
 2022 - Subodh Uniyal (BJP)

Election results

2022

See also
 List of constituencies of the Uttarakhand Legislative Assembly
 Tehri Garhwal district

References

External links
  

Tehri Garhwal district
Assembly constituencies of Uttarakhand
2002 establishments in Uttarakhand
Constituencies established in 2002